Sanharib Malki Sabah (born 1 March 1984) is a retired Syrian footballer of Aramean ethnicity  who played as a striker. Besides his Syrian nationality, he also holds Belgian and Turkish passports.

For K.S.V. Roeselare, his previous club, he scored their first European goal in the first qualifying round of the UEFA Cup 2006-07 against FK Vardar from Macedonia.

International career
He received his first cap in the 2010 FIFA World Cup qualification tournament for Syria against Kuwait on June 8, 2008, thereby eliminating the possibility of playing for Belgium ever again although just one month earlier he was on a training camp with the Belgium national football team under 23s.

International goals
Scores and results table. Syria's goal tally first:

|}

References

External links
 
 Career stats at sporting.be

1984 births
Living people
Syrian footballers
Syrian Christians
Assyrian footballers
People from Qamishli
Assyrian/Syriac Syrians
Royale Union Saint-Gilloise players
K.S.V. Roeselare players
Beerschot A.C. players
K.S.C. Lokeren Oost-Vlaanderen players
Panthrakikos F.C. players
Roda JC Kerkrade players
Kasımpaşa S.K. footballers
Al-Wakrah SC players
Fatih Karagümrük S.K. footballers
Syria international footballers
Belgian Pro League players
Eredivisie players
Süper Lig players
Qatar Stars League players
2011 AFC Asian Cup players
Syrian expatriate footballers
Expatriate footballers in Belgium
Expatriate footballers in Greece
Expatriate footballers in Qatar
Expatriate footballers in the Netherlands
Expatriate footballers in Turkey
Syrian expatriate sportspeople in Belgium
Syrian expatriate sportspeople in Greece
Syrian expatriate sportspeople in Qatar
Syrian expatriate sportspeople in the Netherlands
Syrian expatriate sportspeople in Turkey
Belgian people of Assyrian/Syriac descent
Turkish people of Assyrian descent
Syrian people of Turkish descent
Belgian people of Syrian descent
Turkish people of Syrian descent
Association football forwards
Footballers from Brussels